Margaret of York may refer to:
Margaret of York (1446–1503), Duchess of Burgundy, daughter of Richard Plantagenet, 3rd Duke of York
Margaret of York (1472), niece of the Duchess of Burgundy
St. Margaret Clitherow (1556–1586), English saint of the Roman Catholic Church
Princess Margaret, Countess of Snowdon (1930–2002), sister of Queen Elizabeth II